The flip jump (also called the flip) is a figure skating jump.

The International Skating Union (ISU) defines a flip jump as "a toe jump that takes off from a back inside edge and lands on the back outside edge of the opposite foot". It is executed with assistance from the toe of the free foot.

History
The origin of the flip jump is unknown, although American professional figure skater Bruce Mapes might have created it. Writer Ellyn Kestnbaum calls the jump "somewhat trickier than the loop for most skaters. considerably more so than the salchow or toe loop", because of its unstable inside edge and the precision required to align and time the jump's vault from the toepick. As a consequence, quadruple flip jumps are, as ESPN puts it, "rare". Kestnbaum also states that it is crucial that the skater's edge not be too deep, but instead almost forms a straight line.  

Variations of the flip jump include the half flip and the split flip. The half flip is often used as a simple transitional movement during a step sequence and as a takeoff for other half jumps. A split flip is a single flip jump with a split position at the peak of the skater's position in the air. There is also no record of the first male skater to perform the flip. 

In competitions, the base value of a single flip is 0.50; the base value of a double flip is 1.80; the base value of a triple flip is 5.50; and the base value of a quadruple flip is 11.00.

Firsts

References

Works cited
 "ISU Figure Skating Media Guide 2021/22" (Media guide). International Skating Union. 22 September 2022. Retrieved 5 October 2022.
 Kestnbaum, Ellyn (2003). Culture on Ice: Figure Skating and Cultural Meaning. Middletown, Connecticut: Wesleyan University Press. .

External links 

 Shoma Uno's first quad flip (YouTube clip)
 Comparison of Nathan Chen and Shoma Uno's quad flip (YouTube clip)

Figure skating elements
Jumping sports